Targa top, or targa for short, is a semi-convertible car body style with a removable roof section and a full width roll bar behind the seats. The term was first used on the 1966 Porsche 911 Targa, and it remains a registered trademark of Porsche AG.

The rear window is normally fixed, but on some targa models, it is a removable plastic foldable window, making it a convertible-type vehicle. Any piece of normally fixed metal or trim which rises up from one side, over the roof and down the other side is sometimes called a targa band, targa bar, or a wrapover band.

Targa tops are different from T-tops, which have a solid, non-removable bar running between the top of the windscreen and the rear roll-bar, and generally have two separate roof panels above the seats that fit between the window and central t-bar.

Origin 
The word targa first came into use from the 1965 Porsche 911 Targa, though it was not the first to use the removable roof panel system. The system first appeared in 1957 on the limited-production Fiat 1200 “Wonderful” by Vignale, designed by Giovanni Michelotti. The later Triumph TR4 from 1961, another Michelotti design, also featured a similar system, defined by Triumph as a surrey top. The 1964 SAAB Catherina prototype and the 1965 Toyota Sports 800 both used similar systems before the 1967 Porsche 911 Targa.

The targa style roof opening became popular in the 1960s and 1970s, when there were fears that the Department of Transportation (DOT) in the United States would ban convertibles, due to concerns over the safety of occupants when a car overturns. As a result, manufacturers adopted Targa tops or T-tops. As Porsche helped to popularise this body style, they took out a trademark for the Targa name and manufacturers sought for alternative names for their removable tops. Porsche got the name "Targa" from the Targa Florio, the road race in Sicily where Porsche was very successful. Targa means "plate" (or placard) in Italian.

Targa and T-top numbers have slowly declined as manufacturers discontinued them in favour of full convertibles with retractable hardtops and folding metal roofs such as the Mercedes-Benz SLK, and by better structural engineering with pop-up roll over bars behind the seats and front roll-over bar incorporated into the front windscreen.

Glass roof 
The year 1996 saw the debut of a retractable glass roof in the Porsche 993 Targa, a design continued on the 996 and 997 Targa. The glass roof retracted underneath the rear window revealing a large opening. A shade was there to help prevent the greenhouse effect of the closed roof. This system was a complete redesign, as previous Targa models had a removable roof section and a wide B-pillar functioning as a roll bar. The new glass roof design allowed the 993 Targa to retain nearly the same side-on profile as the other 911 Carrera variants and eliminated the inconvenience of storing the removed top of the old system. The Targa had the body of the Cabriolet with the Targa glass roof replacing the fabric roof. The 911 Targa continued with the all-new 996-model and gained a lifting hatchback glass window. This, in turn, was used on the later 997 model of 911.

Motorized roof 

With the introduction and production of the latest two generations of 911, the Type 991 and 992, Porsche decided to take the Targa in a different direction from that of the previous water-cooled Type 996/997 cars. The latest Targas were introduced in 2013 and 2019, and unlike the Type 993/996/997 Targas, the newer cars have somewhat returned to their earliest Targa roots by utilizing a solid roof panel spanning over the front seats. However unlike the manual lift-out panels of earlier 911s, the Type 991 and 992 Targa's roof panels are mechanized for automated lift-away and storage under the rear glass roof, which itself is mechanized to lift up and out of the way as the roof panel is placed into its stowed position. The Type 991 Targa also brought back the styling feature of the 'Targa bar' that was perhaps the most obvious and overt design cue of the air-cooled generation Targas. But unlike the previous Targa hoops, the one used on the Type 991 is in sections, where the horizontal span member is a physically separate piece that itself is mechanized to lift off of its vertical supports in order to allow the solid roof panel and its motorized components to slide rearwards as the panel is being stored within the car.

Rotating roof 

Ferrari introduced a hybrid variation of the targa roof and folding metal roof with the 180 degree rotating roof featured on the 2005 Ferrari Superamerica designed by Leonardo Fioravanti, which was previewed on his Alfa Romeo Vola concept in 2000. The concept was also used in the 2010 Renault Wind.

Examples of traditional Targa tops 

 Alfa Romeo Vola (2000 concept, rotating roof)
 AMC Eagle Sundancer (1980–84)
 Bentley Continental SC
 BMW 3 Series Baur Cabriolets E21 TC1 (1978-1982), E30 TC2 (1983–1991), E36 TC4 (1992–1996)
 Bugatti Veyron Grand Sport/Vitisse (2009-2015)
 Chevrolet Corvette coupé (1984–current)
 Dodge Viper
 Ferrari 308 GTS
 Ferrari 328 GTS
 Ferrari 348 ts/GTS
 Dino 246 GTS
 Ferrari F355 GTS
 Ferrari F50
 Ferrari Superamerica (rotating roof)
 Fiat X1/9
 Ford GTX-1 (1966 12 Hours of Sebring winner)
 Ford GTX-1 Roadster (2005)
 Honda CR-X del Sol
 Honda NSX-T
 Honda S660
 Jaguar XJ-SC 'twin-targa' cabriolet (1984–1988)
 Koenigsegg (all models)
 Lamborghini Diablo VT Roadster
 Lamborghini Miura Roadster (one-off)
 Lamborghini Aventador Roadster
 Lamborghini Silhouette
 Lamborghini Jalpa
 Lancia Beta Spider (Zagato)
 Lotus Elise
 Maserati MC12
 Matra 530
 Mazda MX-5 RF
 Mercedes-Benz Silver Lightning
 Nissan 100NX
 Nissan URGE
 Nissan 300ZX
 Pontiac Solstice Coupe (2009)
 Porsche 911 Targa (1966–present)
 Porsche 912 Targa
 Porsche 914
 Porsche Carrera GT 
 Porsche 918 Spyder 
 Qvale Mangusta
 Renault Wind
 Saab Catherina prototype (1964)
 Smart Roadster
 Suzuki Samurai
 Suzuki Cappuccino (optional)
 Tesla Roadster (2008)
 Tesla Roadster (2020)
 Toyota Sports 800 (1965–1969)
 Toyota Supra
 Triumph TR4 Surrey top (1961)
 Triumph TR4A Surrey top (1965)
 Triumph TR250 Surrey top (1967)
 TVR Tuscan Speed Six

See also 
 Bimini top
 Dodger (sailing)
 Hardtop
 T-top

References

External links 
 

Automotive styling features